The Cardross Lakes are an irrigation drainage basin system located approximately  south-west of Mildura, in the Mallee region of Victoria, Australia. The lakes are notable for being the only known occurrence within Victoria of the Southern Purple Spotted Gudgeon (Mogurnda adspersa), discovered in 1995, believed to be extinct in Victoria since the 1930s. The Murray hardyhead (Craterocephalus fluviatilis) can be found in the Cardross Basin.

References

Lakes of Victoria (Australia)
Mallee catchment
Rivers of Loddon Mallee (region)
Mildura